The 1998 Northeast Louisiana Indians football team represented Northeast Louisiana University in the 1998 NCAA Division I-A college football season. The Indians offense scored 227 points while the defense allowed 322 points.

Schedule

References

Northeast Louisiana
Louisiana–Monroe Warhawks football seasons
Northeast Louisiana Indians football